Tsebrykove is an urban-type settlement with some 2,900 inhabitants in the Rozdilna Raion, Odesa Oblast in Ukraine. Population:

History
Before World War II Tsebrykove was known as Hoffnungstal, Гофнунгсталь, and was populated by Germans. Hoffnungstal was founded in 1819 by Swabian settlers who were granted land. Some of them were Zionists who intended to go on to Palestine and settle there but were refused entry by Turkey. Some of that group settled in Ukraine and some in Georgia. There is an active group of Germans from Russia who study the history of the area. Residents of Hoffnungstal supported the Whites during the Russian Civil war and the town was bombarded by artillery mounted on railway cars. The struggle over collectivization resulted in many deportations and deaths including a number of people shot on the front steps of the Lutheran church in 1937. Nearly all of the remaining Germans left with the retreating German army during World War II. Many German immigrants from Tsebrykove to the United States homesteaded about 12 miles northwest of Burlington, Colorado in the "Russian Settlement."

On 7 March 1923 Tsebrykove Raion with the administrative center in Tsebrykove was established. On 30 December 1962 Tsebrykove Raion was abolished and merged into Velyka Mykhailivka Raion.

As of 2001, the largest ethnic groups of Tsebrykove are Ukrainians, Romanians and Russians.

Notable persons
 Georg Leibbrandt (1899–1982), scholar and politician in the Nazi Party, born in Hoffnungsfeld, a "daughter" colony of Hoffnungstal
Immanuel Winkler  (1886–1932), parish priest from 1911 to 1918
Igor Levitin (1952–), Russian politician

See also
Black Sea Germans

References

External links
Hoffnungstal Odessa - 1848 Village History
 photos of Hoffnungstal

Urban-type settlements in Rozdilna Raion
1819 establishments in Ukraine
Former German settlements in Odesa Oblast
Tiraspolsky Uyezd